American Pride may refer to:

 American Pride (schooner), a three-masted schooner built in 1941
  American Pride (ship), a paddlewheel passenger riverboat built-in 2012, formerly known as Queen of the Mississippi
 American Pride (album), by the country music band Alabama